José Antonio Arias Mujica (born October 9, 1944), known as Antonio Arias, is a Chilean former football defender, who played for the Chile national team between 1968 and 1973, gaining 30 caps. He was part of the Chilean squad for the 1974 World Cup.

At club level, Arias played for Magallanes, Unión Española and Palestino.

Personal life
He is the older brother of the former footballer Jorge Arias.

References

External links
 
 

1944 births
Living people
Footballers from Santiago
Chilean footballers
Association football defenders
Chile international footballers
1974 FIFA World Cup players
Unión Española footballers
Deportes Magallanes footballers
Magallanes footballers
Club Deportivo Palestino footballers
Chilean Primera División players